Garbage is a 2018 Indian drama film written and directed by Qaushiq Mukherjee (Q). Jointly produced by Mukherjee, Shailesh R Singh, Hansal Mehta, Hina Saiyada and Dipankar Chaki, the film stars Trimala Adhikari, Tanmay Dhanania, Shruti Viswan, Satarupa Das and Satchit Puranik in the lead roles. It was premiered in the panorama section at the 68th Berlin International Film Festival. The story follows Phanishwar, a taxi driver in Goa who has held a woman captive in his home. He encounters Rami, a victim of revenge porn and their world collide. Garbage became available on Netflix during 2018.

Cast
Trimala Adhikari as Rami Kumar
Tanmay Dhanania as Phanishwar
Satarupa Das as Nanaam
Satchit Puranik as Baba Satchitanand
Shruti Viswan as Arri 
Gitanjali Dang as Simon

Production
Director Qaushiq Mukherjee said that Garbage reflected "the kind of time I was living in for the last two years, personally and social speaking." He began writing the script which was initially titled The fucked. He said that several parts of the film were based on real characters and incidents. The taxi driver and the captive girl were "composites of different people" while the protagonist was based on his friend who had died in 2017. Mukherjee said that the film was mostly unscripted and "workshop-driven." To prepare for his character, Tanmay worked as a production driver for the team for a month. Mukherjee wrote the script while dealing with the deaths of a few close ones when he said he realised that "death is the only reality."

Reception
Deborah Young of The Hollywood Reporter wrote: "For lovers of his angry, dreamy, sexually violent aesthetic, Garbage does not disappoint. Jay Weissberg of Variety called it a "tiresome torture porn disguised as a femme-empowering revenge thriller." Anupam Kant Verma of Firstpost wrote: "For a film that wants to stand out from the saccharine infested world of Bollywood, Garbage ends up emulating its black and white, good and evil charms." Soumya Rao of Scroll.in felt that "the shock and horror are not just narrative tools but symptoms of the times in which we live." She also praised Trimala and Tanmay's performance, calling them "fearless".

Shubhra Gupta of The Indian Express noted that the film is "sometimes too in-your-face, the way it takes two young women and a man, flings them into terrible situations, and observes them, pitilessly, trying to negotiate those tough tangles." J Hurtado of Screen Anarchy called the film a "bold, no holds barred attack on the hypocrisy of the religious right wing in India today." Further calling it "too violent, too unafraid, and too real to even be considered as a commercial viability." He also included it in his list of 14 Favorite Indian Films of 2018.

References

External links

Films set in Goa
Films shot in Goa
Indian erotic drama films
2010s Hindi-language films
2010s erotic drama films
2018 drama films
Films directed by Qaushiq Mukherjee